Tony Hawk: Vert is a mobile skateboarding video game created by Glu Mobile. It was released on November 17, 2009, the same day Tony Hawk: Ride released for consoles. The game features a unique camera perspective and a 3D visual style.

Gameplay 
Tony Hawk: Vert is played in a half-pipe and focuses on vert skateboarding. A new point-of-view, unique in the franchise, is used in Vert, with the player viewing their skater from behind one of the ramps of the half-pipe. The game offers three locations and twelve challenges, which include scoring against a clock, "extreme" skater tasks, copy cat challenges, and bonus mini-games (such as trick requests).

Reception 
Jon Mundy of Pocket Gamer called the game "a slick, imaginative reboot of an established series" and rated it 3.5 stars out of 5. He went on to say that "bright and full of imaginative touches, Tony Hawk: Vert marks an exciting new direction for the series. It's stopped just short of greatness by its slim running time and a slight lack of depth".

References

External links 
 Archive of official website
 Tony Hawk: Vert at Moby Games

2009 video games
Skateboarding video games
Tony Hawk's (series)
Mobile games
Glu Mobile games
Single-player video games